The 1932 South Africa Juniors tour of Argentina was a collection of friendly rugby union games undertaken by Junior Springboks, the second South Africa national rugby union team against Argentine clubs and selections. That tour was the first of the Junior Springboks, who had formed one year before. 

During their tour on Argentina, the Boks stayed at Belgrano Athletic Club. They played their last match v Gimnasia y Esgrima (BA), the Argentine league champion. After the match, captain J. Nykamp praised the performance of the team, stating that "Gimnasia y Esgrima did not give us a moment of truce and we had to appeal to all our resources to impose."

This tour started a long relationship between the two federations.

Results

The tour ended with a match between two mixed teams of South African and Argentine players.

References

South Africa tour 2
South Africa national rugby union team tours
Rugby union tours of Argentina
T
1932 in South African rugby union